Shane Harvey is a former Australian rules footballer.

Career
He was drafted by the Essendon Football Club in the 2001 AFL Draft at pick 18 in the first round from the Northern Knights. He played 11 games with Essendon before being delisted after the 2003 season.

The Kangaroos picked him at pick 6 of the 2004 Pre-Season Draft after they had promised his brother Brent Harvey that they would select Shane if he was available. He played 3 games for the Kangaroos and finished his AFL career at the end of the 2004 season.

He has since played for country and suburban clubs, including Wakool Football Club in the Golden Rivers Football League, in which he helped Wakool win the premiership in 2006, and then North Heidelberg Football Club in 2008 and 2009. He played for Barooga in the Murray Football League in 2010.

Shane has the ability to kick a lot of goals in the local competitions. He kicked 116 goals for Wakool in 2006 and 107 in 2007, scored 108 goals for North Heidelberg in 2008 and 102 in 2009, and scored 102 goals at Barooga in 2010.

His Junior club was Preston R.S.L. Football Club.

Playing for North Heidelberg against Hurstbridge in 2021, he scored his 1000th Northern Football League goal, becoming the first player to do so.

References

External links

Essendon Football Club players
North Melbourne Football Club players
1983 births
Living people
Australian rules footballers from Victoria (Australia)
Northern Knights players
North Heidelberg Football Club players